Growing Up or Growin' Up may refer to:

Ageing, growing older
Progressing toward psychological maturity

Film
Growing Up (1971 film), a British sex education film
Growing Up (1983 film), a Taiwanese film
Growing Up (1996 film), a Hong Kong film of 1996

Literature
Growing Up (memoir), a 1982 memoir by Russell Baker
Growing Up (novella) or Takekurabe, an 1895–1896 novella by Higuchi Ichiyō

Music

Albums
Growing Up (Hi-Standard album) or the title song, 1996
Growing Up (IU album), 2009
Growing Up Live, a 2003 concert film and 2019 album by Peter Gabriel
Growing Up, an EP by Mr FijiWiji, 2015
Growin' Up (The Kelly Family album), 1997
Growin' Up (Luke Combs album), 2022
Growing Up, the debut studio album of The Linda Lindas, 2022

Songs
"Growin' Up" (song), by Bruce Springsteen, 1973
"Dammit (Growing Up)", by Blink-182, 1997
"Growing Up", by Fall Out Boy from Fall Out Boy's Evening Out with Your Girlfriend, 2003
"Growing Up", by Peter Gabriel from Up, 2002
"Growing Up", by Jason Lancaster from As You Are, 2014
"Growing Up", by Lisa Lougheed from Evergreen Nights, 1988
"Growing Up", by the Maine from Black & White, 2010
"Growing Up", by Stephen Bishop from the film Care Bears Movie II: A New Generation, 1986
"Growing Up", by Thomas Rhett from Country Again: Side A, 2021
"Growing Up (Sloane's Song)", by Macklemore and Ryan Lewis from This Unruly Mess I've Made, 2016

Television
Growing Up (1997 Philippine TV series), a 1997–1999 youth drama series
Growing Up (2011 Philippine TV series), a 2011–2012 youth drama series
Growing Up (Singaporean TV series), a 1996–2001 English-language drama series
 "Growing Up", an episode of The New Casper Cartoon Show

See also

Grow Up (disambiguation)